The 1958–59 Liga Alef season saw Bnei Yehuda win the title and promotion to Liga Leumit.

Final table

Relegation play-offs
A promotion-relegation play-off between the 11th and 12th placed clubs in Liga Alef, Maccabi Sha'arayim and Hapoel Afula, and the second placed clubs of the regional divisions of Liga Bet, Hapoel Netanya and Hapoel Be'er Sheva. Each club played the other three once.

Shortly after the Relegation play-offs, as Hapoel Netanya appealed against the fielding of Hapoel Afula player Zvi Singel, and the three matches which were played by Hapoel Afula were given as a walkover win to the opposition, as the disciplinary tribunal determined that Singel was registered with Hapoel Beit HaShita and was not properly transferred to Hapoel Afula. Hapoel Afula appealed the decision, but the appeal was denied  and, as a result, Hapoel Afula were relegated to Liga Bet and Hapoel Netanya took their place in Liga Alef

References
Previous seasons The Israel Football Association 
Hapoel Afula almost certain in Liga Alef Maariv, 7.6.59, Historical Jewish Press 
Hapoel Balfouria and Beer Sheva in Liga Alef Davar, 14.6.59, Historical Jewish Press 

Liga Alef seasons
Israel
2